Groutville is a town in Ilembe District Municipality in the KwaZulu-Natal province of South Africa.  Home of the late ANC leader, Chief Albert Luthuli, Home to the late RT Rev j. Mdelwa Hlongwane founder to The Bantu Methodist Church.

Mission station several km south-west of Stanger. Established in 1844 by the Reverend Aldin Grout (1803–1894) of the American Missionary Society and named after him. Formerly it was known as Umvoti.

References

Populated places in the KwaDukuza Local Municipality
1844 establishments in the Colony of Natal
Populated places established in 1844